Jakin is a Spanish cultural group, magazine, and publishing house. Founded in 1956, it is one of the oldest in Basque language. "Jakin" means "knowledge" in Basque and the magazine specializes on social and cultural issues. One of the leading members of Jakin is the philosopher Joxe Azurmendi. Currently, the editor-in-chief of Jakin is Lorea Agirre.

History and profile
Before the establishment of the magazine in 1956 Jakin was a cultural group. The first name of the magazine was Teologiaren Yardunak, and Nikolas Ormaetxea and Txillardegi, among others, wrote there.

The publication was prohibited by Franco's regime in 1969; publication resumed in 1977. During that period, Jakin began publishing books. Jakin was instrumental in the "cultivation" of Basque, increasing its ability to "express difficult topics".

In 2006, the magazine won the Argizaiola award.

See also
 List of magazines in Spain

References

External links
 

1956 establishments in Spain
Magazines established in 1956
Basque-language magazines
Cultural magazines
Philosophy magazines
Political magazines published in Spain
Mass media in San Sebastián
Basque culture
Bi-monthly magazines published in Spain